Two highways in the U.S. state of Nevada have been signed as Route 91:
U.S. Route 91 in Nevada, replaced by Interstate 15
Nevada State Route 91 (1959), which existed until the 1970s renumbering